Thomas Ambrose Butler (March 21, 1837 –  	September 6, 1897) was an Irish American Catholic priest known for his writings on Irish immigration and his promotion of Irish settlements in the state of Kansas, which led to the founding of the Irish colony of Butler City, Kansas.

Biography

Thomas Butler was born on March 21, 1837, in Dublin Ireland to a middle-class family. Growing up, he attended St. Paul's Parish in Dublin. He received secondary education through Schools of the Christian Brothers. Upon hearing of John Henry Newman's new school, Catholic University of Ireland, young Butler was the first to sign his name upon the roster. On October 19, 1854, Butler left the University and enrolled in the humanities class at St. Patrick's College, known at the time as Maynooth College. For the first three years of his priesthood, Butler remained in Ireland where he was appointed to a curacy in Wicklow County at St. Nicholas Parish in Dunlavin.

In 1867, Butler immigrated to America and was assigned to Leavenworth, Kansas. Bishop John Baptiste Miège made Butler associate pastor of the Cathedral of Immaculate Conception. While here, Butler started analyzing the life of an average Irish immigrant in America as well as promoting the state of Kansas as a safe-haven for the Irish to start farms and communities. Although stationed in Leavenworth, Butler spent much of his 8 years traveling the state of Kansas, offering Mass, dispensing sacraments, and assessing the progress of Irish immigrants. From 1872 until about 1874, Butler was placed in charge of the parish in Hoge, Kansas.

After his time in Leavenworth, Butler was assigned pastor of St. James Parish in St. Louis. While there, he interacted with many immigrants living in deplorable conditions and not fully finding root in their new home. In 1877, remembering the fertile lands back in Kansas, Butler won the support of wealthy Irish men to fund efforts to create a colony in Northeast Kansas. Soon, they purchased 12,000 acres of land in Pottawatamie County, Kansas from Union Pacific. On February 1, 1887 Butler organized a final meeting of the Colonization Board; the next day, a group of men headed west on the train to start the community. Eventually 600 people moved to this land and established a central community, Butler City; the center of the community being St. Columbkille's Church.

At the same time Butler was organizing the Irish Colony, he founded St. Cronan parish in St. Louis.

In April 1890, Butler made a visit to the former Butler City (the name of the town had since been changed to Blaine). He was met with a grand celebration with nearly all the surrounding residents attending.

On September 6, 1897, while still pastor of St. Cronan's, Butler died. At Butler's Requiem Mass two days later, P. B. Cahill of Macon, Missouri gave a moving sermon:

Writings
Butler became well known for his writings and poetry, a trait that earned him the nickname "The Poet Priest of the West". He published two major works in his life, both concerning themselves with Irish immigration.

The State of Kansas and Irish Immigration
In 1871, Butler published The State of Kansas and Irish Immigration. In this pamphlet, Butler describes his experience in Kansas as a pastor at the Catholic cathedral in Leavenworth. Butler provides advice to people in Ireland who are thinking of immigrating to the United States.

The Irish on the Prairies: and Other Poems
While still at the Cathedral Of Leavenworth, Butler also published a book of his own poems and songs titled The Irish on the Prairies: and Other Poems. The works included were about the "Old Land", Immigration, and life on the prairies of Kansas.

References

1837 births
1897 deaths
Alumni of St Patrick's College, Maynooth
American Roman Catholic clergy of Irish descent
Writers from St. Louis
Burials at Calvary Cemetery (St. Louis)
Irish emigrants to the United States (before 1923)
19th-century Irish Roman Catholic priests
Christian clergy from Dublin (city)
19th-century American Roman Catholic priests